"Orange Night" (stylized as "ORANGE★NIGHT") is a song by Japanese singer-songwriter Rina Aiuchi. It was released on 2 November 2005 through Giza Studio, as the second single from her fifth studio album Delight. The song reached number twelve in Japan and has sold over 16,058 copies nationwide. The song served as the theme song to the Japanese anime television series, Fighting Beauty Wulong.

Track listing

Charts

Weekly charts

Certification and sales

|-
! scope="row"| Japan (RIAJ)
| 
| 16,058 
|-
|}

Release history

References

2005 singles
2005 songs
J-pop songs
Song recordings produced by Daiko Nagato
Giza Studio singles
Songs written by Rina Aiuchi